The entire work of this article is based on the 2011 Census of India, conducted by the Office of the Registrar General and Census Commissioner, under Ministry of Home Affairs (India), Government of India.

Categorization 
Census of India (2011) states the following criteria in defining towns. They are:

 Statutory Town (ST): All places with a municipality, corporation, cantonment board, or notified town area committee, etc.
 Census Town (CT): Those which have a population greater than 5000. Other definitions include percentage of non-agriculture working population and population density.

Abbreviations 

Sources:
 Abbreviation reference

List

See also 
 List of cities in India by population
 Place names in India
 Thakurnagar CT

References

External links 
 Indian Census

 

es:Localidades de la India
mk:Список на градови во Индија